A Gatsby is a South African submarine sandwich consisting of a bread roll filled with chips (French fries) and a choice of fillings and sauces. It originated in Cape Town and is popular throughout the Western Cape province. The sandwich is typically large and shared by several people.

Recipe 
There is no standard recipe for a Gatsby, but it is usually offered in a long (one foot or more) French-style bread roll cut lengthwise. Other breads used may include hot dog buns or roti flat breads, although a filled roti is usually referred to as a salomie. The sandwich is made large to be shared, usually four ways. The filling of a Gatsby comprises chips with any number of other ingredients such as meats, fish and eggs. Meat fillings may include chargrilled steak, masala steak, chicken, polony sausage, Vienna sausage and Russian sausage. Fried or pickled fish, calamari, curry and eggs are also frequently offered. The fillings are commonly dressed with achar pickles or peri peri sauce.

Although the Gatsby is typically made with meat fillings, vegan versions can be found that are usually made by substituting marinated soy steak for the meat. Healthier versions can also be found, using ingredients such as beans which are said to significantly reduce cholesterol and fat levels.

History

The Gatsby sandwich originated in 1976 in Athlone, in the Cape Flats area of Cape Town. Food shop owner Rashaad Pandy wanted to serve a quick but filling meal to workers helping him renovate his store. He filled a large round loaf with "slap chips" (South-African-style chips with vinegar), polony sausage and achaar and cut this into wedges. "Froggy", one of the workers, declared the sandwich a "Gatsby smash", alluding to the movie The Great Gatsby which had been screened at an Athlone cinema. The name stuck and Pandy subsequently offered the sandwich in his shop. The sandwich grew in popularity and was adjusted to use a long French-style roll. The gatsby sandwich is a popular hangover cure for Capetonians.

See also

 Bunny chow—a South African fast-food dish consisting of a hollowed-out loaf of bread filled with curry
 Chip butty—a French-fry sandwich from the United Kingdom
 Mitraillette—a French-fry sandwich from Belgium
 List of African dishes
 List of sandwiches

References

External links

French fries
Afrikaans words and phrases
South African cuisine
Sandwiches
The Great Gatsby